Ezell Park is an urban park in southeastern Nashville, Tennessee. The park is home to a soccer complex formerly used by the Nashville Metros of the USL PDL, and is run by the Nashville Board of Parks and Recreation.  The park is adjacent to a correctional facility which is, as of 2018, being used as the Davidson County Jail.

Parks in Nashville, Tennessee
Soccer venues in Tennessee
Sports venues in Nashville, Tennessee